The 1983 Dunedin mayoral election was part of the New Zealand local elections held that same year. In 1983, elections were held for the Mayor of Dunedin plus other local government positions including twelve city councillors. The polling was conducted using the standard first-past-the-post electoral method.

Background
Mayor Cliff Skeggs was re-elected for a third term defeating two other candidates, though his majority fell. The Citizens' retained their comfortable council majority, winning nine seats with two won by independents and one seat to the Labour Party.

Results
The following table shows the results for the election:

References

Mayoral elections in Dunedin
Dunedin
Politics of Dunedin
1980s in Dunedin
October 1983 events in New Zealand